Foz Meadows is an Australian fantasy novelist, blogger and poet.

Work
An essayist, blogger and reviewer, Meadows has written for The Mary Sue, Apex Magazine, Black Gate, The Huffington Post,  A Dribble of Ink, Strange Horizons and Tor.com. Meadows is a novelist working in young adult fantasy. Their novels, blog writing, and other essays have been nominated for significant genre awards such as the Hugo Award and the Ditmar Award.

Personal life
Raised on the Central Coast of New South Wales, Meadows has lived across Australia, including Melbourne and Sydney, and the UK, including Bristol and Aberdeen. Meadows is genderqueer and married to philosophy lecturer Toby Meadows. They have one son, born while living in the UK and they now live in Brisbane. Meadows is bisexual. In 2015, they came out as genderqueer.

Awards
2014, 2017 & 2018 Nomination for Hugo Award for Best Fan Writer 
2014 & 2016 Nomination for Ditmar Award for Best Fan Writer 
2017 Ditmar Award winner for Best Fan Writer
2017 Bisexual Book Awards Finalist for An Accident of Stars
2018 Norma K Hemming Award (Short Fiction) Winner for "Coral Bones"
2019 Hugo Award for Best Fan Writer

Bibliography

Poetry
Scales of Time – Phantazein, edited by Tehani Wessely, FableCroft Publishing, October 2014
Silence – Goblin Fruit, Summer 2012
Conversation – Cordite Poetry Review no. 27, March 2008

Novels
A Strange and Stubborn Endurance, Tor, July 2022
A Tyranny of Queens (Book 2 of the Manifold Worlds series), Angry Robot, May 2017 
An Accident of Stars (Book 1 of the Manifold Worlds), Angry Robot, August 2016 
The Key to Starveldt (The Rare: Book 2) - Ford Street Publishing, October 2011
Solace & Grief (The Rare: Book 1) - Ford Street Publishing, March 2010

Stories/novellas
"Curiosity" - Holdfast Anthology Issues 5-8, edited by Laurel Sills and Lucy Smee, July 2017
"The Song of Savi" - The Fantasist Magazine: Issue 3, edited by Will Waller and Evan Adams, June 2017
"Mnemosyne" - The Fantasist Magazine: Issue 3, edited by Will Waller and Evan Adams, June 2017
"Letters Sweet as Honey" - The Fantasist Magazine: Issue 3, edited by Will Waller and Evan Adams, June 2017
"Coral Bones" – Monstrous Little Voices, Rebellion Publishing, March 2016
"Bright Moon" – Cranky Ladies of History, edited by Tehani Wessely and Tansy Rayner Roberts, FableCroft Publishing, March 2015
"Ten Days Grace" – Apex Magazine: Issue 63, edited by Sigrid Ellis, 4 August 2014
"Needs Must" – Sincere Forms of Flattery, edited by Olivia Hambrett and Sandi Sieger, O+S Publishing, June 2013

References 

 

Australian women novelists
Living people
1980s births
Australian LGBT poets
Australian bloggers
Australian women poets
Australian women short story writers
21st-century Australian novelists
21st-century Australian short story writers
21st-century Australian poets
21st-century Australian women writers
Australian women bloggers
People with non-binary gender identities
Non-binary writers
Bisexual writers
Australian LGBT novelists
Bisexual non-binary people
Hugo Award-winning fan writers